André Mazziotta (born 8 September 1902, date of death unknown) was a French racing cyclist. He rode in the 1927 Tour de France.

References

1902 births
Year of death missing
French male cyclists
Place of birth missing